Moses Masuwa (30 July 1971 – 27 April 1993) was a Zambian footballer and member of the national team.  He was among those killed in the crash of the team plane in Gabon in 1993.

References

External links

1971 births
1993 deaths
Zambian footballers
Victims of aviation accidents or incidents in Gabon
Zambia international footballers

Association footballers not categorized by position
Footballers killed in the 1993 Zambia national football team plane crash